Sts. Peter and Paul Orthodox Church, also known as Sts. Peter and Paul Russian Orthodox Church, is a historic church complex and national historic district located in the Lovejoy neighborhood of Buffalo, Erie County, New York. The complex was built between 1912 and 1965, and consists of the yellow brick Byzantine Revival style, roughly 2-story church (designed in 1932 by architect Joseph E. Fronczak), a 1-story parish hall (designed in 1964 by Robert Zinter), a 2-story frame house that serves as a rectory (c. 1912), and a frame garage (c. 1912).  The church has a cross-in-square type plan, and the front facade features two 3-story towers.  It is the oldest Orthodox church in Buffalo and oldest in use in the Orthodox Diocese of New York and New Jersey.

It was listed on the National Register of Historic Places in 2015.

References

External links
SS. Peter and Paul Orthodox Church Website

Byzantine Revival architecture in New York (state)
Churches completed in 1932
Churches in Buffalo, New York
European-American culture in Buffalo, New York
Eastern Orthodox churches in the United States
Historic districts on the National Register of Historic Places in New York (state)
Orthodox Church in America churches
Churches on the National Register of Historic Places in New York (state)
Russian-American culture in New York (state)
Historic districts in Buffalo, New York
National Register of Historic Places in Buffalo, New York
Greek Orthodox churches in the United States